Bhupendrabhai Patel had been sworn in as 17th Chief Minister of Gujarat on 12 December 2022, along with 8 Cabinet Rank Ministers, 2 Minister of State with Independent charges and other 6 as Minister of States.

Background
After thumping majority in 2022 Gujarat Legislative assembly election BJP forms majority Government in Gujarat. Incumbent CM along with Council of Ministers resigns. 

On 12th December 2022, Bhupendrabhai Rajikant Patel sworn in as 18th Chief Minister along with 16 other ministers.These includes 8 Cabinet ranked ministers, 2 Minister of State with Independent charges and 6 Minister of State.

Council of Ministers

Cabinet Minister

Minister of State (Independent Charges)

Minister of State

Sources

Cabinet Spokesperson

Source

Demographics of Council of Ministers

Outgoing Ministers
These are the Ministers which were part of the First Bhupendrabhai Patel ministry but were not included in the Second Bhupendrabhai Patel ministry. These includes

Rajendra Trivedi
Jitu Vaghani
Purnesh Modi
Kiritsinh Rana
Nareshbhai Patel
Pradip Parmar
Arjunsinh Chauhan
Jagdiah Panchal
Dinesh Parmar
Jitu Chaudhary
Manisha Vakil
Nimisha Suthar
Arvind Raiyani
Kiritsinh Vaghela
Gajendrasinh Parmar
RC Makwana
Vinod Moradiya
Deva Malam

References

Lists of current Indian state and territorial ministries
Bharatiya Janata Party state ministries
2022 in Indian politics
Gujarat ministries
Cabinets established in 2022